Swathu is a 1980 Indian Malayalam-language film,  directed by N. Sankaran Nair and produced by S. Usha Nair. The film stars Jagathy Sreekumar, Thikkurissy Sukumaran Nair, Jayadevan and Zarina Wahab. The film has musical score by G. Devarajan.

Cast
Jagathy Sreekumar as Vikraman
Thikkurissy Sukumaran Nair as Madhava Rao
Jayadevan
Zarina Wahab as Rohini
Paul Vengola
Madhu Malhothra
Mrs. Lal
N. Govindankutty as Podiyan Pilla
Ravikumar as Sundhareshan
Varalakshmi
 Kripa
 Philip Mathew
 Hariharan
 Jayachandran

Soundtrack
The music was composed by G. Devarajan and the lyrics were written by M. D. Rajendran, Kavalam Narayana Panicker.

References

External links
 

1980 films
1980s Malayalam-language films
Films directed by N. Sankaran Nair